This Mortal Coil is a collection of fantasy and horror short stories by author Cynthia Asquith. It was released in 1947 and was the only collection of the author's stories to be published by Arkham House.  It was published in an edition of 2,609 copies.

Contents

This Mortal Coil contains the following tales:

 "In a Nutshell"
 "The White Moth"
 "The Corner Shop"
 "'God Grante That She Lye Stille'"
 "The Playfellow"
 "The Nurse Never Told"
 "The Lovely Voice"
 "The First Night"
 "The Follower"

Adaptations
"God Grante That She Lye Stille" was adapted in 1961 by Robert Hardy Andrews as an episode of the anthology TV series Thriller.

References

1947 short story collections
Horror short story collections
Fantasy short story collections
Arkham House books